John Walsh (December 4, 1841 – May 25, 1924) was an Irish-born Union Army soldier during the American Civil War. He received the Medal of Honor for gallantry during the Battle of Cedar Creek, fought near Middletown, Virginia on October 19, 1864. The battle was the decisive engagement of Major General Philip Sheridan's Valley Campaigns of 1864 and was the largest battle fought in the Shenandoah Valley.

Medal of Honor citation
The President of the United States of America, in the name of Congress, takes pleasure in presenting the Medal of Honor to Corporal John Walsh, United States Army, for extraordinary heroism on 19 October 1864, while serving with Company D, 5th New York Cavalry, in action at Cedar Creek, Virginia. Corporal Walsh recaptured the flag of the 15th New Jersey Infantry.

See also

List of Medal of Honor recipients
List of American Civil War Medal of Honor recipients: T-Z

References

External links
Military Times Hall of Valor

1841 births
1924 deaths
19th-century Irish people
Irish soldiers in the United States Army
People from County Tipperary
Irish emigrants to the United States (before 1923)
People of New York (state) in the American Civil War
People of Massachusetts in the American Civil War
Union Army soldiers
United States Army Medal of Honor recipients
Irish-born Medal of Honor recipients
American Civil War recipients of the Medal of Honor
People from Tipperary (town)
Military personnel from County Tipperary